Marcelo Demoliner and David Vega Hernández were the defending champions but only Vega Hernández chose to defend his title, partnering Simone Bolelli. Vega Hernández successfully defended his title.

Bolelli and Vega Hernández won the title after defeating Sergio Martos Gornés and Ramkumar Ramanathan 6–4, 7–5 in the final.

Seeds

Draw

References

External links
 Main draw

Sánchez-Casal Cup - Doubles